Vocalese is the ninth studio album by Jazz band The Manhattan Transfer, released  in 1985 on the Atlantic Records. Recording sessions took place during 1985. Production came from Tim Hauser and Martin Fischer. This album is considered to be The Manhattan Transfer's most critically acclaimed album. It received 12 Grammy nominations, making it second only to Michael Jackson's Thriller as the most nominated individual album. It also received extremely high ratings from music critics, including a 4.5 out of 5 stars rating from Allmusic. The album peaked at number 2 on the Top Jazz Albums and number 74 on the Billboard 200. The album's title Vocalese refers to a style of music that sets lyrics to previously recorded jazz instrumental pieces. The vocals then reproduce the sound and feel of the original instrumentation. Jon Hendricks, proficient in this art, composed all of the lyrics for this album.

Critical reception 
 Allmusic

Awards
This album earned the group Grammy Awards for:

Best Jazz Vocal Performance, Duo or Group
Best Vocal Arrangement for Two or More Voices for Cheryl Bentyne and Bobby McFerrin for their arrangement of "Another Night In Tunisia".

It also earned Best Jazz Vocal Performance, Male for Bobby McFerrin and Jon Hendricks for "Another Night In Tunisia".

Track listing
 "That's Killer Joe" (Benny Golson, Jon Hendricks) – 5:02
 "Rambo" (J J Johnson, Jon Hendricks) – 3:19
 "Airegin" (Sonny Rollins)  – 3:19
 "To You" (Thad Jones) – 3:53
 "Meet Benny Bailey" (Quincy Jones, Jon Hendricks) – 3:29
 "Another Night in Tunisia" (Dizzy Gillespie, Jon Hendricks, Frank Paparelli) – 4:12
 "Ray's Rockhouse" (Ray Charles, Jon Hendricks) – 5:06
 "Blee Blop Blues" (Count Basie - Jon Hendricks) – 3:01
 "Oh Yes, I Remember Clifford" (Benny Golson, Jon Hendricks) – 3:45
 "Sing Joy Spring" (Clifford Brown, Jon Hendricks) – 7:07
 "Move" (Denzil Best, Jon Hendricks) – 2:49

Personnel 

The Manhattan Transfer
 Cheryl Bentyne – vocals, soloist (1, 2, 3, 5, 8), arrangements (6)
 Tim Hauser – vocals, soloist (1, 3, 10, 11), arrangements (1)
 Alan Paul – vocals, soloist (1-4, 9), vocal arrangements (5, 7)
 Janis Siegel – vocals, soloist (1, 2, 3, 8, 10, 11), vocal arrangements (1, 2, 3, 8, 10)

Musicians and Guests
 Yaron Gershovsky – synthesizers (1), arrangements (1), acoustic piano (2, 3, 5), vocal arrangements (5)
 Casey Young – synthesizer programming (1)
 Tommy Flanagan – acoustic piano (4)
 John Barnes – synthesizers (7), Yamaha TX816 (7), Fairlight CMI (7), Synclavier (7), vocoder (7), Linn 9000 (7), arrangements (7)
 Craig Harris – synthesizer voice (7),  programming (7), vocoder programming (7), sampling (7)
 McCoy Tyner – acoustic piano (9)
 Walter Davis, Jr. – acoustic piano (10)
 Dick Hindman – acoustic piano (11)
 Wayne Johnson – guitars (1, 3, 5), banjo (5)
 Freddie Green – guitars (2, 8)
 Ray Brown – bass (2, 8)
 Alex Blake – bass (3, 5)
 Richard Davis – bass (4)
 Ron Carter – bass (9)
 John Patitucci – bass (10)
 Marshall Hawkins – bass (11)
 John Robinson – drums (1)
 Grady Tate – drums (2, 8, 9)
 Ralph Humphrey – drums (3, 5, 10, 11)
 Philly Joe Jones – drums (4)
 Eric Dixon – saxophone (2, 7)
 Danny House – saxophone (2)
 Kenny Hing – saxophone (2, 8)
 Marshal Royal – saxophone (2, 8)
 Johnny Williams – saxophone (2, 8)
 Don Roberts – baritone saxophone (5, 11), tenor saxophone (9)
 James Moody – tenor sax solo (5)
 Danny Turner – saxophone (8)
 Richie Cole – alto sax solo (11)
 Clarence Banks –  trombone (2, 8)
 Bill Hughes – trombone (2, 8)
 Charles Loper – trombone (2, 8)
 Mel Wanzo – trombone (2, 8)
 Dennis Wilson – arrangements and conductor (2, 8), trombone (9)
 Sonny Cohn – trumpet (2, 8)
 Johnny Coles – trumpet (2, 8)
 Bob Ojeda – trumpet (2)
 Byron Stripling – trumpet (2, 8)
 Snooky Young – trumpet (8)
 Dizzy Gillespie – trumpet solo (10)
 The Count Basie Orchestra – orchestra (2, 8)
 Thad Jones – music supervisor (2, 8)
 Dick Reynolds – arrangements (4, 11)
 Phil Mattson – vocal arrangements (9)
 The Four Freshmen: Mike Beisner, Bob Flanagan, Autie Goodman and Rod Henley – additional backing vocals (4)
 Bobby McFerrin – bass vocal (6), vocal percussion (6), vocals (6), vocal arrangements (6)
 Jon Hendricks – additional backing vocals (6), vocal soloist (7)

Production 
 Producers – Tim Hauser and Martin Fischer
 Recorded and Mixed by Elliot Scheiner
 Additional Engineers – Craig Harris, Gary Ladinsky and Brian Malouf.
 Assistant Engineers – Gene Curtis, Dan Garcia, Steve Katayama, Steve MacMillan, Dan Matovina, Tom Size and Jay Willis.
 Mixed at Sound Labs Hollywood (Hollywood, CA).
 Mastered by Bernie Grundman at Bernie Grundman Mastering (Hollywood, CA).
 Musical Director – Bud Schaetzle
 Album Coordination – Ivy Skoff
 Publishing Coordination – Sue Yahm
 Art Direction – Fayette Hauser and Nels Israelson
 Photography – Nels Israelson
 Management – Brian Avnet

Charts

 US Billboard 200 – 74
 US Jazz Albums (Billboard) – 2

References

External links
 The Manhattan Transfer Official Website

The Manhattan Transfer albums
1985 albums
Atlantic Records albums